Laura Helen Shavin (born 23 December 1965, in Islington, London) is a British actress, voice over artist, presenter, narrator and comedian.

Career
Shavin has worked as a minor television actress and voice-over artist, as well as performing on Radio 4 comedy programmes. In particular, she was a regular performer on The Now Show for several years. In 1990, Shavin played Stephanie, the daughter of Daisy and Onslow, in Keeping Up Appearances in the episode "The Christening".

She presented a Saturday evening radio show between 17:00 and 18:00 on BBC Essex, between 10 May and 2 August 2014 and recommencing on 9 May until 1 August 2015.

Shavin co-hosted Sunday breakfast on talkRADIO with Jake Yapp, presenting their first show on 27 March 2016.

Shavin has presented "Offcuts" (2021).

References

External links
 

1965 births
English radio presenters
English television actresses
English voice actresses
English women comedians
People from the London Borough of Islington
Living people
British women radio presenters